Hans Raastad (born 8 May 1943 in Skien) was a leader of the Workers' Youth League in Norway from 1969 - 1971. He succeeded Ola Teigen.

See also
 Framfylkingen

References

Norwegian socialists
1943 births
Living people
People from Skien
20th-century Norwegian people